For information on all Eastern Kentucky University sports, see Eastern Kentucky Colonels

The Eastern Kentucky Colonels baseball team is a varsity intercollegiate athletic team of Eastern Kentucky University in Richmond, Kentucky, United States. The team is a member of ASUN Conference, which is part of the National Collegiate Athletic Association's Division I. Eastern Kentucky's first baseball team was fielded in 1925. The team plays its home games at Turkey Hughes Field in Richmond, Kentucky. The Colonels are coached by Chris Prothro.

Colonels in Major League Baseball
Since the Major League Baseball Draft began in 1965, Eastern Kentucky has had 34 players selected.

See also
List of NCAA Division I baseball programs

References

External links
 

Sports clubs established in 1925